The  San Jose SaberCats season was the 15th season for the franchise in the Arena Football League. The team was coached by Darren Arbet and played their home games at HP Pavilion at San Jose. This was the first season for the SaberCats since 2008, after the league went on hiatus in 2009 and the franchise wasn't active in 2010.

Standings

Regular season schedule
The SaberCats began the season at home against the Spokane Shock on March 11. On July 23 they played their final regular season game on the road against the Tampa Bay Storm.

Regular season

Week 1: vs. Spokane Shock

Week 2: vs. Kansas City Command

Week 3: at Chicago Rush

Week 4: vs. Iowa Barnstormers

Week 5: vs. Utah Blaze

Week 6: at Tulsa Talons

Week 7: vs. Philadelphia Soul

Week 8: BYE

Week 9: vs. Arizona Rattlers

Week 10: at Pittsburgh Power

Week 11: at Utah Blaze

Week 12: vs. Georgia Force

Week 13: at Dallas Vigilantes

Week 14: BYE

Week 15: at Arizona Rattlers

Week 16: at Cleveland Gladiators

Week 17: vs. Jacksonville Sharks

Week 18: vs. Orlando Predators

Week 19: at Spokane Shock

Week 20: at Tampa Bay Storm

References

San Jose SaberCats
San Jose SaberCats seasons
2011 in sports in California